Futebol Club de Felgueiras 1932 is an association football club based in Felgueiras, Porto District, Portugal founded in 2006 after F.C. Felgueiras ended in 2005 due to financial problems.

Recent Seasons 

†Qualified to Liga 3 qualification series (Finished 2nd, promoted to Liga 3)

Current squad

Coaches 

 António Lima Pereira (2007/08–2010/11)
 Ricardo Soares (2011/12–2012/2013)
 Alex (2013/14)
 Ricardo Soares (2014/15)
 Zamorano (2015/16)†
 Nuno Pinto (2015/16)
 Rui Luís (2016/17)†
 Ricardo Silva (2016/17)
 Horácio Gonçalves (2017/18- 2018/19)†
 Ricardo Sousa (2018/19)
 Luís Pinto (2019/20)†
 Nuno Andrade (2019/20)
 Rui Ferreira (2020/21)†
 Pintassilgo (2020/21)
 Bruno China (2021–present)

† Sacked/Replaced before the end of the season

League and cup history
Below are listed the club's performances in the past seasons. 
Updated as of 5 February 2022

References

External links

F.C. Felgueiras 1932 on Playmakerstats

 
Football clubs in Portugal
Association football clubs established in 2006
2006 establishments in Portugal